Francesco Di Bartolo (Catania, Sicily, 1826 – 1913) was an Italian engraver and painter.

He resided in Catania for most of his adult life, and became Director of the Civic Museum in his native city. He was honorary professor at the Institute of Fine Arts of Naples. He was prolific in engraved and acquaforte depictions. Among his acquaforte colored engravings are: Gli Iconoclasti of Morelli, the paintings of animals by Palizzi, and a series of portraits including of Count Cavour. Among his engravings with burin are those of a Madonna by Murillo and of the Madonna of the Harpies by Andrea del Sarto. He won various silver and gold prizes at exhibitions. He was awarded an honor in the Order of San Maurizio, and became an associate member of many Academies in Italy, as well as of the Academy in St Petersburg, Russia.

References

External links
 Short Biography for an exhibition of this work

1826 births
1913 deaths
Artists from Catania
Kingdom of the Two Sicilies people
Italian engravers
19th-century Italian painters
Italian male painters
20th-century Italian painters
Artists from Sicily
19th-century Italian male artists
20th-century Italian male artists
20th-century engravers